Heads of International Research Organizations (HIROs) is an organization composed of directors of International Research Organizations. It was established by Harold Varmus in 1998. Representatives from United States, Canada, China, EU, India, South Africa, and South Korea. The members include director of NIH, Wellcome Trust, Korea Health Industry Development Institute (KHIDI).

References

International medical and health organizations